Joel Buchsbaum (1954 - December 29, 2002) was an American sportswriter who worked for Pro Football Weekly from 1979 until his death.

Career
Buchsbaum was noted especially for his NFL Draft analysis and evaluation of college football players. He was a guest commentator for KMOX in St. Louis and KTRH in Houston. He is considered one of the first "draft experts" in sports media. In 2003, he received the Dick McCann Memorial Award from the Pro Football Hall of Fame.

References

American sportswriters
Dick McCann Memorial Award recipients
1954 births
2002 deaths